Minutochku (One Minute) is a studio album by Russian band Vesyolye Rebyata.

Style
This album is very different from the works of "Vesyolye Rebyata" in the 1970s. In the first, was replaced vocalist, second, style of radically departed from previous. "Soviet beat" was replaced by the more fashionable musical currents, including disco, Euro disco, synthpop and new wave. Also noticeably simplified arrangements, sophisticated art rock arrangements from the album "Lubov' Ogromnaya Strana" gave way to the synthesizers. Track "Баня" an example of new wave music, "Не волнуйтесь, тетя" is a Euro disco track.

Track list
Автомобили 3:14
Вечер При Свечах 5:34
 Баня 3:31
 Гранитный Город 4:11
 Корабли 3:10
 Не Волнуйтесь, Тетя 4:22
 Скоро 3:32
 Жил В Африке Слон 4:44
 Чертаново 2:55
 Шутовское Королевство 3:11

References

Vesyolye Rebyata albums
New wave albums by Russian artists
Synth-pop albums by Russian artists
1987 albums